Dorin Adrian Mihuț (born 26 June 1982) is a Romanian former football player who played as a right back. In his career Mihuț played for teams such as: Olimpia Salonta, FC Bihor, Dinamo București and UTA Arad, among others.

Honours
Dinamo București
Romanian League Championship: 2006–07

External links
 
 

1982 births
Living people
People from Salonta
Romanian footballers
Association football defenders
Liga I players
Liga II players
FC Bihor Oradea players
FC Dinamo București players
FC UTA Arad players
SCM Râmnicu Vâlcea players
CS Luceafărul Oradea players
Romanian expatriate footballers
Romanian expatriate sportspeople in Hungary
Expatriate footballers in Hungary
FC Bihor Oradea (2022) managers